Todd Hallowell (born August 29, 1952) is an American film producer. His credits include How the Grinch Stole Christmas, Cinderella Man, A Beautiful Mind, Apollo 13, Dark Phoenix and Thor: Love and Thunder.

External links

1952 births
Living people
People from Cambridge, Minnesota
Film producers from Minnesota